The Alolya (the Alol) is a river in Opochetsky, Novorzhevsky, Bezhanitsky, and Pustoshkinsky Districts of Pskov Oblast in Russia. It is a right tributary of the Velikaya.

The source of the Alolya is Lake Arno on the Bezhanitsy Hills in Opochetsky District. It flows east, forming the border between Opochetsky and Novrozhevsky Districts, then downstream forms the border between Opochetsky and Bezhanitsky Districts and departs east from the border. The Alolya flows through Lake Kudeverskoye and turns southwest, where it again forms the border between Opochetsky and Bezhanitsky Districts, and downstream - between Opochetsky and Pustoshkinsky Districts. It accepts the Tsipilyanka from the left and departs from the border south into Pustoshkinsky District. The mouth of the Alolya is close to the village of Verbilovo.

The drainage basin of the Alolya includes many lakes, the biggest of which is Lake Kamennoye.

References

Rivers of Pskov Oblast